"Listen to Your Heart" is a song written, arranged and produced by Stock Aitken Waterman (SAW) for Sonia's debut studio album, Everybody Knows (1990). Released in November 1989 as the album's third single, it reached number ten on the UK Singles Chart and number 22 in Ireland. The B-side was Sonia's version of "Better Than Ever" which was originally recorded by Lisa Fabien and was not included on the original release of her debut album.

Chart performance
"Listen to Your Heart" entered the UK Singles Chart in early December 1989 at number 42. After a slow start, the song peaked at number 10 five weeks later, thus becoming Sonia's second UK top ten hit after her debut single "You'll Never Stop Me Loving You", and charted for a total of ten weeks. In Ireland, "Listen to Your Heart" charted for one week, on 4 January 1990, at number 22. In France, it entered the charts on 3 March 1990 at number 46, reached a peak of number 39 three weeks later and charted for six weeks there. In Australia, "Listen to Your Heart" debuted at number 157 in February 1990 and peaked at number 119 in March 1990, spending nine weeks on the chart. It debuted at a peak of number 27 on the Eurochart Hot 100, and reached number 17 on the European Airplay chart in its second week; on both charts, it charted for four weeks.

Formats and track listings
7" / Cassette single
 "Listen to Your Heart" – 3:27
 "Better than Ever" – 3:29
12" / CD single
 "Listen to Your Heart" (Extended Mix) – 5:57
 "Better than Ever" – 3:29
 "Listen to Your Heart" (Instrumental) – 3:27

Credits and personnel
The following people contributed to "Listen to Your Heart":
Sonia – lead vocals
Mae McKenna, Miriam Stockley – backing vocals
Mike Stock – keyboards, backing vocals
Matt Aitken – guitars, keyboards
A Linn – drums
Dave Ford – mixing

Charts

Appearances in other media
In Brazil, the song was included in the international soundtrack of Rainha da Sucata becoming a big hit there.

In the Philippines, the song was used in the show It's a Date, a dating comedy game hosted by Plinky Recto and Tom Lupton, formerly aired on CNN Philippines (Formerly RPN 9) in 1989.

References

1989 singles
Sonia (singer) songs
Song recordings produced by Stock Aitken Waterman
1989 songs
Chrysalis Records singles
Songs written by Mike Stock (musician)
Songs written by Matt Aitken
Songs written by Pete Waterman